State Road 42 (SR 42) is an east–west road in Central Indiana.  Its western terminus is at US 40 in Terre Haute.  Its eastern terminus is at State Road 67 and State Road 144 in Mooresville.

Route description 
From the western terminus with US 40, SR 42 heads east out of Terre Haute, paralleling Interstate 70 (I-70).  Before leaving Terre Haute SR 42 passes by the Terre Haute International Airport.  The service road to the airport is State Road 342 (SR 342).  SR 42 heads east from Terre Haute passing over  I-70.  SR 42 then has an intersection with State Road 59.   After SR 59, SR 42 still parallels I-70 but the distance between the two routes is greater.  SR 42 heads east passing through an intersection with U.S. Route 231.  SR 42 heads due east then just south of Eminence SR 42 turns due north and heads through Eminence.  SR 42 turns back east north of Eminence and now SR 42 parallels I-70.  SR 42 passes through Crown Center and then SR 42 enters Monrovia.  in Monrovia SR 42 has an intersection with State Road 39.  SR 42 heads east out of Monrovia, heading towards Mooreville.  In Mooreville SR 42 has intersections with State Road 267 and SR 67/SR 144.

Major intersections

References

External links

042
Transportation in Clay County, Indiana
Transportation in Morgan County, Indiana
Transportation in Owen County, Indiana
Transportation in Putnam County, Indiana
Transportation in Vigo County, Indiana